Indian Springs Park is a public park located on the east side of Davenport, Iowa, United States. The land was donated to the city in 1921 by Mrs. D.N. Richardson with the expressed purpose of creating a park. The property contains a spring that was used by Native Americans, from which the park derives its name, as well as early travelers and the areas first settlers. The spring itself was capped in 1929 and a pipe  in diameter directs the water into a storm drain. During the high water season in the spring the park's basin fills with spring water and shore birds return to nest. The park, which is largely undeveloped, has served as a play area for the neighborhood children, students from neighboring Hoover Elementary School, and later the day care that is housed there. The park is a contributing property in the Village of East Davenport Historic District, which was listed on the National Register of Historic Places in 1980. It was added to the Davenport Register of Historic Properties in 2005.

References

Historic district contributing properties in Iowa
Parks on the National Register of Historic Places in Iowa
Davenport Register of Historic Properties
Parks in Davenport, Iowa
National Register of Historic Places in Davenport, Iowa